Lawton Chiles Preparatory School (LCPS) is a non-traditional private school in Longwood, Florida. LCPS is a 501(c)3 nonprofit organization founded in 1971. Their enrollment as of 2011 is fifteen students. It is not regulated by any school boards or organizations. 
The school believes that students' unique combination of gifts and talents help them be good citizens, and thus it focuses on cultivating students' intellectual growth in the subjects in which they are most interested and gifted. Using project-based curricula, they challenge students to increase their individual learning pace with one-on-one academic and life skills instruction.

The school is currently closed as of 1997.

External links
Lawton Chiles Preparatory School official website

Private schools in Florida
Schools in Seminole County, Florida
Longwood, Florida